The Garden of the Orphanage in Amsterdam is a 1894 painting by German painter Max Liebermann, a figure of Realism, Impressionism, and Post-Impressionism. It is now in the Musée d'Art moderne et contemporain of Strasbourg, France. Its inventory number is 55.974.0.680.

The painting was bought by the museum's director, Wilhelm von Bode, in the very year of its completion. It is the last in a series of works depicting scenes from the Amsterdam orphanage, begun in 1876 with a series of drawings in situ and culminating in several oil paintings, the largest of which are now in the Städel Museum of Frankfurt (1882), the Kunsthalle of Hamburg (1885), and the Strasbourg museum.

References

External links

Le Jardin de l’orphelinat de la ville d’Amsterdam  on the museum's website

Paintings by Max Liebermann
Paintings in the collection of the Strasbourg Museum of Modern and Contemporary Art
1894 paintings
Oil on canvas paintings
Orphanages in Europe